Giovanni Lombardo Radice (born 23 September 1954, Rome, Italy) is an Italian film actor, also known as John Morghen.

He first began his career in theater before he starred in Ruggero Deodato's The House on the Edge of the Park (1980). Throughout the 80s Radice appeared in many Italian cult films such as Cannibal Apocalypse (1980), City of the Living Dead (1980), Stage Fright (1987) and The Church (1989).  
Radice is best known for his villainous roles in Italian horror films, and notably for the spectacular and gruesome death scenes his characters semi-regularly fall victim to.  In several interviews, he reportedly stated that he wished he had never portrayed Mike Logan in Cannibal Ferox, criticizing the movie for being both fascist and racist and abusive towards animals. Radice created his stage name, John Morghen, by taking the anglicized form of his first name (Giovanni becomes John) and using his grandmother's maiden name as his last name (Morghen). His family practically disowned him when they discovered he was using his family name to create incredibly violent films.

Radice's uncle is Pietro Ingrao, the first member of the Italian Communist Party to be Head of Parliament in the 1970s. His father was the mathematician Lucio Lombardo Radice. The writer  was his elder brother. Radice nowadays often posts texts criticizing social injustice, capitalism and corruption in Italy.

Radice has written about having a cocaine addiction when younger.

Selected filmography
Cannibal Apocalypse (1980, a.k.a. Apocalypse Domani)
City of the Living Dead (1980, a.k.a. The Gates of Hell)
The House on the Edge of the Park (1980)
Cannibal Ferox (1981, a.k.a. Make Them Die Slowly)
Deadly Impact (1984)
Stage Fright (1987, a.k.a. Deliria)
Eleven Days, Eleven Nights (1987)
Phantom of Death (1988, a.k.a. Un delitto poco comune)
The Church (1989, a.k.a. La Chiesa)
The Devil's Daughter (1991, a.k.a. La Setta)
Body Puzzle (1992)
Ricky & Barabba (1992)
Padre Pio: Between Heaven and Earth (2000)
The Soul Keeper (2002)
Gangs of New York (2002)
The Omen (2006)
 The Hideout (2007)
A Day of Violence (2010)
The Reverend (2011)
Violent Shit: The Movie (2015)

References

External links

 Interview at deliria-italiano.de

1954 births
Italian male film actors
People of Lazian descent
Living people
Male actors from Rome